Mateusz Mróz (born 9 January 1980 in Gostyń) is a Polish former cyclist.

Major results
2007
1st Coupe des Carpathes
1st Grand Prix de la ville de Nogent-sur-Oise
2008
1st Majowy Wyścig Klasyczny-Lublin
1st Stage 1 Szlakiem Grodów Piastowskich
1st Stage 7 Course de la Solidarité Olympique
2009
2nd Overall Bałtyk–Karkonosze Tour
1st Stage 7
3rd Overall Tour of Małopolska

References

1980 births
Living people
Polish male cyclists
People from Gostyń
Sportspeople from Greater Poland Voivodeship